Aileen Gilroy (born 1 March 1993) is an Australian rules footballer playing for Hawthorn in the AFL Women's (AFLW). Gilroy signed with North Melbourne as a rookie during the 2019 rookie signing period in August. She made her debut against Melbourne at Casey Fields in the opening round of the 2020 season.

Australian rules football career 
On 30 August 2019, Gilroy signed with North Melbourne as a rookie during the 2019 rookie signing period, joining her fellow countrywoman Mairéad Seoighe at the club. Quickly establishing herself as a fan-favourite, Gilroy made 7 appearances for the Kangaroos in 2020, averaging almost 10 disposals a game, and finished fifth in the best-and-fairest count. It was revealed she signed on with the club for two more seasons on 17 June 2021, tying her to the club until the end of 2023. In May 2022, Gilroy surprisingly joined expansion club Hawthorn, after telling North Melbourne she'd recommit to them.

Statistics  
Updated to the end of S7 (2022).

|-
| 2020 ||  || 8
| 7 || 0 || 0 || 50 || 18 || 68 || 12 || 8 || 0.0 || 0.0 || 7.1 || 2.6 || 9.7 || 1.7 || 1.1 || 0
|-
| 2021 ||  || 8
| 10 || 0 || 1 || 102 || 20 || 122 || 21 || 28 || 0.0 || 0.1 || 10.2 || 2.0 || 12.2 || 2.1 || 2.8 || 0
|-
| 2022 ||  || 8
| 11 || 0 || 1 || 102 || 30 || 132 || 19 || 23 || 0.0 || 0.1 || 9.3 || 2.7 || 12.0 || 1.7 || 2.1 || 1
|-
| S7 (2022) ||  || 7
| 10 || 3 || 5 || 112 || 11 || 123 || 14 || 53 || 0.3 || 0.5 || 11.2 || 1.1 || 12.3 || 1.4 || 5.3 || 0
|- class="sortbottom"
! colspan=3 | Career
! 38 !! 3 !! 7 !! 366 !! 79 !! 445 !! 66 !! 112 !! 0.1 !! 0.2 !! 9.6 !! 2.1 !! 11.7 !! 1.7 !! 2.9 !! 1
|}

Gaelic football career

Club 
At club level, Gilroy has played for St Brigids and IT Sligo. In 2009, she was voted Connacht Young Player of the Year.

Inter-county 
In 2017, she won her first All-Star.

Association football career

Youth 
A Killala native, Gilroy attended St. Patrick's College, Lacken Cross and played youth football for Killala AFC. In February 2010, she helped St. Patrick's College win the Umbro FAI Schools Senior B Girls All-Ireland Final against St Kilian's German School.

Club 
In 2011, Gilroy signed for Castlebar Celtic, one of the six teams that competed in the WNL's inaugural 2011–12 season, and stayed at the club until 2014.

International 
As a teenager, Gilroy represented the Republic of Ireland at U17 and U19 level. She represented Ireland at the 2010 FIFA U-17 Women's World Cup, where Ireland reached the quarter-finals. In June 2013, she was named to the squad for the 2013 Summer Universiade.

In February 2014, Gilroy received her first senior call-up.

Honours

Gaelic football 
 Mayo
 All-Ireland Senior Ladies' Football Championship
Runners-up: 2017
 Individual
 Connacht Young Player of the Year
Winner: 2009
 Ladies' Gaelic football All Stars Awards
Winner: 2017

Australian rules football 
Individual
  gold standards award: S7 (2022)
 Hawthorn games record holder: 10 (Tied with Charlotte Baskaran, Catherine Brown, Jess Duffin, Tilly Lucas-Rodd, Akec Makur Chuot, Tamara Smith, and Lucy Wales)
  record holder for behinds: 5
  record holder for behinds in a season: 5 – S7 (2022)
  record holder for behinds in a game: 2 – S7 (2022) (Tied with Kaitlyn Ashmore, Jess Duffin, and Jasmine Fleming)

References

External links 

1993 births
Living people
North Melbourne Football Club (AFLW) players
Irish players of Australian rules football
Irish expatriate sportspeople in Australia
Mayo inter-county ladies' footballers
Gaelic games players from County Mayo
Republic of Ireland women's association footballers
Castlebar Celtic W.F.C. players
Women's National League (Ireland) players
Association footballers from County Mayo
Women's association football midfielders
Republic of Ireland women's youth international footballers
Women's association football forwards
Hawthorn Football Club (AFLW) players